The Bayer designation π Cancri (Pi Cancri) is shared by two stars in the constellation Cancer:

 π1 Cancri (π1 Cnc, Pi1 Cancri, Pi1 Cnc), 81 Cancri
 π2 Cancri (π2 Cnc, Pi2 Cancri, Pi2 Cnc), 82 Cancri, also sometimes called just π Cancri

See also
Rho Cancri

Cancri, Pi
Cancer (constellation)